This is a list of castles and chateaux located in the Central Bohemian Region of the Czech Republic.

B
 Benátky nad Jizerou Chateau
 Bečváry Chateau
 Bezno Chateau
 Bělá pod Bezdězem Chateau
 Blahotice Chateau
 Bolechovice Chateau
 Bon Repos Chateau
 Brandýs nad Labem Chateau
 Brnky u Prahy Chateau
 Březnice Chateau
 Březno Chateau
 Budenice Chateau
 Buštěhrad Chateau

C
 Cerhenice Chateau
 Chlukov Castle
 Chlum (u Čáslavi) Castle
 Chlum Castle
 Chlum Chateau, Mirošovice
 Chlumín Chateau
 Chotýšany Chateau
 Chvatěruby Castle
 Čechtice Chateau
 Čejchanov Castle
 Čelina Chateau
 Červené Janovice Chateau
 Červený Hrádek u Sedlčan Chateau
 Český Šternberk Castle
 Církvice Chateau
 Cítov Chateau

D
 Diblíkov Chateau
 Dobrohošť Chateau
 Dobrovice Chateau
 Dobřejovice Chateau
 Dobřichovice Chateau
 Dobříš Castle
 Dobříš Chateau
 Dolní Beřkovice Chateau
 Dolní Břežany Chateau
 Domousnice Chateau
 Drahenice u Březnice Chateau
 Drábské světničky Castle
 Dražice (Benátky nad Jizerou) Castle
 Drštka Castle
 Dymokury Chateau
 Džbán Castle

F
 Filipov Chateau

H
 Harasov Castle
 Hlavačov Castle
 Hlavenec Chateau
 Hlízov Chateau
 Hluboš Chateau
 Hodkov Chateau
 Hodkovice Chateau
 Horky nad Jizerou Chateauou
 Horoměřice Chateau
 Hořelice Chateau
 Hořín Chateau
 Hořovice Chateau
 Hospozín Chateau
 Hostivice Chateau
 Hrad u Čtyřkol Castle
 Hrad u Úval Castle
 Hradištko Chateau
 Hradové Střimelice Castle
 Hrádek u Lovčic Castle
 Hrádek Castle in Kutná Hora
 Hrochův Hrádek Castle
 Hynšta Castle

J
 Jablonná Chateau
 Jemniště Chateau
 Jenčov Castle
 Jenštejn Castle
 Jetřichovice Chateau
 Ježov Castle near Senohraby
 Jince Chateau
 Jirny Chateau
 Jivno Castle
 Josefův Důl Chateau

K
 Kačina Chateau
 Kamenice Chateau
 Kamýk nad Vltavou Castle
 Karlík Castle
 Karlštejn Castle
 Kazín Castle
 Kácov Castle
 Kladno Chateau
 Klamorna Castle
 Klášter Hradiště nad Jizerou Chateau
 Klášterní Skalice Chateau
 Klecany Chateau
 Klemperka Castle
 Kluky Chateau
 Kňovice Chateau
 Kokořín Castle
 Koleč Chateau
 Kolešovice Chateau
 Kolín Castle
 Komorní Hrádek Chateau
 Konárovice Chateau
 Konopiště Chateau
 Kornhauz Chateau
 Kosmonosy Chateau
 Kosova Hora Chateau
 Kost Castle
 Kostelec nad Černými lesy Chateau
 
 Košátky Chateau
 Kounice Chateau
 Kovanice Chateau
 Kozí Hřbet Castle
 
 Krakovec Castle
 Králův Dvůr Chateau
 Krásná Hora Chateau
 Krnsko Chateau
 Krušovice Chateau
 Křinec Chateau
 Křivoklát Castle
 Křivsoudov Castle
 Kuncberk Castle
 Květnice Castle

L
 Lány Chateau
 Leontýn Chateau
 Lešany Chateau
 Levý Hradec Castle
 Liběchov Chateau
 Liběhrad Castle
 Liblice Chateau
 Libouň Chateau
 Liteň Chateau
 Líšno Chateau
 Lobeč Chateau
 Lobkovice Chateau
 Loděnice Chateau
 Lojovice Chateau
 Loučeň Chateau
 Loukovec Chateau
 Louňovice pod Blaníkem Chateau
 Luštěnice Chateau
 Lužce Chateau
 Lysá nad Labem Chateau

M
 Malkov Castle
 Martiněves Chateau
 Mcely Chateau
 Mělník Chateau
 Měšice u Prahy Chateau
 Měšice Chateau
 Michalovice Castle
 Miličín Castle
 Mladá Boleslav Castle
 Mnichovo Hradiště Chateau
 Mníšek pod Brdy Chateau
 Modletice Chateau
 Molitorov Chateau
 Mrač Chateau

N
 Načeradec Chateau
 Nalžovice Chateau
 Nebřenice Chateau
 Nedamy Castle
 Nedrahovice Chateau
 Nelahozeves Chateau
 Neuberk Chateau
 Neuberk Chateau
 Neustupov Chateau
 Niměřice Chateau
 Nižbor Chateau
 Nové Dvory Chateau
 Nový Ronov Chateau
 Nový Stránov Chateau
 Nymburk Castle

O
 Obříství Chateau
 Odlochovice Chateau
 Odolena Voda Chateau
 Okoř Castle
 Oráčov Castle
 Osečany Chateau
 Ostromeč Castle
 Ostředek Chateau

P
 Pakoměřice Chateau
 Panenské Břežany Chateau
 Pašinka Chateau
 Pirkštejn Castle
 Poděbrady Castle
 Pravonín Chateau
 Předboř Chateau
 Přemyšlení Chateau
 Přerov nad Labem Chateau
 Přistoupim Chateau
 Příbram Castle
 Průhonice Chateau
 Pyšely Chateau

R
 Radim Chateau
 Radíč Chateau
 Radlík Chateau
 Radovesnice Chateau
 Rataje nad Sázavou Chateau
 Ratměřice Chateau
 Rácov Castle
 Roudnice nad Labem Castle
 Roztoky u Prahy Chateau
 Rožďalovice Chateau
 Rožmitál pod Třemšínem Chateau
 Rtíšovice Chateau
 Řepín Chateau
 Říčany Castle

S
 Sazená Chateau
 Sion Castle
 Skalsko Chateau
 Slabce Chateau
 Smečno Chateau
 Smilkov Chateau
 Smolotely Chateau
 Sobín Castle
 Sovínky Chateau
 Stajice Castle
 Stará Dubá Castle
 Staré Hrady Castle
 Starý zámek Castle
 Statenice Chateau
 Stříbrná Skalice Castle
 Střížkov Chateau
 Studénka Chateau
 Suchdol Chateau
 Suchomasty Chateau
 Svatý Hubert Chateau
 Svinaře Chateau
 Šember Castle
 Škvorec Chateau
 Šprymberk Castle
 Štětkovice Chateau
 Štiřín Chateau

T
 Talmberk Castle
 Tehov Castle
 Tetín Castle
 Tloskov Chateau
 Tochovice Chateau
 Točník Castle
 Třebešice Chateau 
 Třebešice Castle
 Třebnice Chateau
 Třebonín Castle
 Třemšín Castle
 Tři trubky Chateau
 Tuchoměřice Chateau
 Tupadly - Slavín Chateau
 Týnec nad Sázavou Castle
 Týřov Castle

U
 Uhy Chateau
 Unhošť Chateau
 Úholičky Chateau
 Úmonín Chateau

V
 Valdek Castle
 Valečov Castle
 Včelní hrádek Chateau
 Velké Všelisy Chateau
 Veltrusy Chateau
 Vidim Chateau
 Vidlákova Lhota Chateau
 Vidovice Chateau
 Vinařice Chateau
 Vlastějovice Chateau
 Vlašim Chateau
 Vlašský dvůr Castle
 Vlčí Pole Chateau
 Vlčkovice Chateau
 Vlkava Chateau
 Vlkov nad Lesy Chateau
 Vojkov Chateau
 Vraný Chateau
 Vrchotovy Janovice Chateau
 Všenory Chateau
 Vysoký Chlumec Castle
 Vysoký Újezd Chateau

Z
 Zásadka Castle
 Zásmuky Chateau
 Zbenice Chateau
 Zbořený Kostelec Castle
 Zbraslav Chateau
 Zbraslavice Chateau
 Zdonín Chateau
 Zduchovice Chateau
 Zlenice Castle
 Zlonice Chateau
 Zruč nad Sázavou Chateau
 Zvěřinec Castle
 Zvěstov Chateau
 Zvířetice Castle
 Zvoleněves Chateau
 Žáky Chateau
 Žebrák Castle
 Žehušice Chateau
 Žleby Chateau

See also
 List of castles in the Czech Republic
 List of castles in Europe
 List of castles

External links 
 Czech Republic - Manors, Castles, Historical Towns
 Hrady.cz 

 
Central Bohemia